Tollnes Ballklubb is a Norwegian football club located in Skien. It currently plays in the Norwegian Third Division.

It was a member of Arbeidernes Idrettsforbund before the Second World War.

Recent history 
{|class="wikitable"
|-bgcolor="#efefef"
! Season
! 
! Pos.
! Pl.
! W
! D
! L
! GS
! GA
! P
!Cup
!Notes
|-
|2000
|D2
|align=right |5
|align=right|22||align=right|11||align=right|4||align=right|7
|align=right|51||align=right|35||align=right|37
|3rd round
||
|-
|2001
|D2
|align=right bgcolor=gold|1
|align=right|26||align=right|14||align=right|8||align=right|4
|align=right|73||align=right|47||align=right|50
|1st round
||Promoted to 1. Division
|-
|2002
|D1
|align=right bgcolor=red|16
|align=right|30||align=right|6||align=right|1||align=right|23
|align=right|37||align=right|92||align=right|19
|2nd round
||Relegated to 2. Division
|-
|2003
|D2
|align=right |4
|align=right|26||align=right|11||align=right|9||align=right|6
|align=right|53||align=right|45||align=right|42
|1st round
||
|-
|2004
|D2
|align=right|4
|align=right|26||align=right|16||align=right|2||align=right|8
|align=right|68||align=right|42||align=right|50
|2nd round
||
|-
|2005
|D2
|align=right|7
|align=right|26||align=right|11||align=right|4||align=right|11
|align=right|49||align=right|46||align=right|37
|1st round
||
|-
|2006
|D2
|align=right bgcolor=red|12
|align=right|26||align=right|7||align=right|5||align=right|14
|align=right|31||align=right|59||align=right|26
|1st round
||Relegated to 3. Division
|-
|2007
|D3
|align=right bgcolor=gold|1
|align=right|22||align=right|17||align=right|2||align=right|3
|align=right|71||align=right|20||align=right|53
|1st round
|
|-
|2008
|D3
|align=right |7
|align=right|26||align=right|11||align=right|3||align=right|12
|align=right|63||align=right|70||align=right|36
||2nd qualifying round
|
|-
|2009
|D3
|align=right |5
|align=right|26||align=right|13||align=right|2||align=right|11
|align=right|81||align=right|55||align=right|41
||1st qualifying round
||
|-
|2010
|D3
|align=right |4
|align=right|26||align=right|17||align=right|3||align=right|6
|align=right|89||align=right|41||align=right|54
|1st round
|
|-
|2011 
|D3
|align=right |10
|align=right|24||align=right|8||align=right|4||align=right|12
|align=right|60||align=right|86||align=right|28
||1st qualifying round
|
|-
|2012
|D3
|align=right |9
|align=right|26||align=right|10||align=right|3||align=right|13
|align=right|47||align=right|55||align=right|33
||1st qualifying round
|
|}

External links
 Tollnes Stadion - Nordic Stadiums

References

 Official website

 
Football clubs in Norway
Association football clubs established in 1932
Sport in Skien
1932 establishments in Norway
Arbeidernes Idrettsforbund